Knoxville Center, originally known as  East Towne Mall, was a shopping mall located in North Knoxville, Tennessee. It was in operation from 1984 to January 2020, and was demolished in 2021.

History
The mall opened in 1984, The mall was located along Interstate 640, which was a fast growing area during the mall's heydey. 
In 1998, Sam’s Club opened its doors for the first time on the southeast corner in the mall’s outlot area. The mall was sold to Simon Property Group spin off Washington Prime Group (now under the name WP Glimcher) On May 29, 2008, Dillard's announced their plans to close due to declining sales. The store closed in September 2008. On February 18, 2016 it was announced that the mall had been placed up for sale once again. The mall was sold in August 2016 to Knoxville Partners LLC. By August 2017, Knoxville Partners LLC had changed the name of the mall back to East Towne Mall. Signage at the mall remained unchanged, and the mall was still marketed as Knoxville Center. JCPenney announced on March 17, 2017 that they would be closing as a plan to close 138 stores nationwide. The store closed on September 17, 2017. Sears announced on May 31, 2018 they would also be closing as part of a plan to close 72 stores nationwide. The store closed September 2, 2018. As of October 2019, the mall had only 12 stores, a dentist's office, an event center and 2 restaurants. The largest of those stores, Belk, announced that they would be closing in mid-November, leaving the mall with no remaining anchor department stores. The store closed on November 16, 2019. On October 31, 2019, Knoxville Center Mall's owners announced that the entire mall would close and all tenants' leases would end on January 31, 2020. The Regal Cinema theatre location closed without any prior warning the same day as the mall's planned closure was announced.

Anchors
Vacant Anchor Space; September 2008 – January 31, 2020 (former Dillard's (Opened as Miller's, later Hess's, 123,601 sq ft.)
Vacant Anchor Space; September 17, 2017 – January 31, 2020 (former JCPenney, 133,431 sq ft.)
Vacant Anchor Space; September 2, 2018 – January 31, 2020 (former Sears, 179,628 sq ft.)
Vacant Anchor Space; November 16, 2019 – January 31, 2020 (former Belk; (Opened as Proffitt's, became Belk,  108,048 sq ft.)

Former anchors
Dillard's (closed in September, 2008)
JCPenney (closed on September 17, 2017)
Proffitt's (Closed due to corporate realignment, reopened as Belk)
Service Merchandise (two story store near Sears which closed to become The Rush Fitness Complex, 54,000 sq ft.)
The Rush Fitness Complex (Re-branded as Gold's Gym)
Gold's Gym (former The Rush Fitness Complex, two level store  54,000 sq ft., closed on May 16, 2018)
Sears (closed on September 2, 2018)
Regal Cinemas; (closed on October 31, 2019 (Original anchor)
Belk; (closed on November 16, 2019)

Services
East Towne Mall opened with a food court in the center of the mall located on the upper level of the Center Court. By October 2019, the food court only had one restaurant, which was a Chinese takeout. There was also a Chinese buffet on the lower level. The food court was located directly next to the 10-screen Regal Stadium Cinema location.

Renovation and name change
East Towne Mall received a major renovation by its owner Simon Property Group in 1997. The outside was left unchanged aside from a new entrance. The inside was renovated with new tile, paint, trim, and other features. The mall adopted a Tennessee mountain theme.  Once the renovation was completed, the name Knoxville Center was adopted.

Closing 
With the mall in decline, its owner had hopes of turning the mall into a mixed-use facility with added office space, retail, dining, and entertainment. By late 2019 this plan had failed and the mall closed completely on 31 January 2020. As of September 2020, the property ownership was reported to be divided between the corporate parents of the Dillard's and Belk stores and a pair of companies named TF Knoxville TN LLC and Millertown Pavillion LLC.

Redevelopment plans
In September 2020, real estate development company Hillwood Enterprises filed a rezoning request for the  mall site with the intention of demolishing the mall and replacing it with an e-commerce fulfillment center for Amazon. The total cost of the redevelopment project was estimated as $70 million. The demolition of the mall began in April 2021, and is planning to have the construction of the Amazon e-commerce warehouse completed and opened by 2022.

References

External links
Official website (archived)

Shopping malls in Tennessee
Buildings and structures in Knoxville, Tennessee
Economy of Knoxville, Tennessee
Tourist attractions in Knoxville, Tennessee
Shopping malls established in 1984
Defunct shopping malls in the United States
Demolished shopping malls in the United States
Shopping malls disestablished in 2020
Demolished buildings and structures in Tennessee
Buildings and structures demolished in 2021